Timon is a given name and surname. 

Timon may also refer to:
 Timón (Madrid), a ward (barrio) of Madrid
 Timon, Maranhão, a town in the Brazilian state of Maranhão
 Timon, Louisiana, United States, an unincorporated community
 Timon (lizard), a genus of wall lizards, including Ocellated Lizard (Timon lepidus)
 Timon (film), a 1973 Croatian film based on Shakespeare's play